Fernando Gómez-Reino (born 21 December 1955) is a Spanish former freestyle swimmer who competed in the 1976 Summer Olympics.

References

1955 births
Living people
Spanish male freestyle swimmers
Olympic swimmers of Spain
Swimmers at the 1976 Summer Olympics